The 2007–08 Florida Gators men's basketball team represented the University of Florida in the sport of basketball during the 2007–08 college basketball season.  The Gators competed in Division I of the National Collegiate Athletic Association (NCAA) and the Eastern Division of the Southeastern Conference (SEC).  They were led by head coach Billy Donovan, and played their home games in the O'Connell Center on the university's Gainesville, Florida campus.

The Gators were looking to rebuild after their 2006–07 season, when they won their second consecutive NCAA national championship.  However, none of the starters returned from their 2006–07 season.

Class of 2007

|-
| colspan="7" style="padding-left:10px;" | Overall Recruiting Rankings: Scout – 3 Rivals – 1 ESPN –
|}

Roster

Coaches

2007–2008 schedule and results

|-
!colspan=8| Exhibition
|-

|-
!colspan=8| Regular season (Non-conference play)
|-

|-
!colspan=8| Regular season (SEC conference play)
|-

|-
!colspan=8| SEC tournament
|-

|-
!colspan=8| National Invitation Tournament
|-

|-

|-

References 

Florida Gators men's basketball seasons
Florida
Florida Gators men's basketball team
Florida Gators men's basketball team
Florida